Byron Black and Grant Connell were the defending champions, but competed this year with different partners.

Connell teamed up with Jim Grabb and lost in second round to David Adams and Andrei Olhovskiy.

Black teamed up with Alex O'Brien and lost in the final 6–3, 4–6, 7–5 against Mark Knowles and Daniel Nestor.

Seeds

Draw

Finals

Top half

Bottom half

References
 Official Results Archive (ATP)
 Official Results Archive (ITF)

Men's Doubles